The 1951 Bolivian Primera División, the first division of Bolivian football (soccer), was played by 8 teams. The champion was Always Ready.

A total of 8 teams played, 1 down from 1950 as Northern was relegated and none was promoted. All teams hailed from La Paz and played at the Hernando Siles stadium

Torneo Interdepartamental

Standings

Relegation play-off

External links
 Official website of the LFPB 

Bolivian Primera División seasons
Bolivia
1951 in Bolivian sport